When the Gods Fall Asleep is a 1972 Brazilian film directed by José Mojica Marins. Marins is best known for the Zé do Caixão (Coffin Joe) film series. The film is a sequel to Marins' 1971 film The End of Man (Finis Hominis), in which the character of Finis Hominis, an influential, messianic culture figure turns out to be an escaped mental patient. Rather than the horror themes which Marins was noted for, the film, like its predecessor, is low budget black humored social satire.

In this film, Finis Hominis (after returning to the asylum) again feels the need to escape the asylum in order to put right the world's increasing social unrest that he sees in the news.

Plot
Finis Hominis is a mental patient who is kept in an insane asylum, and is known for his occasional escapes from the institution, including the most recent episode during which Finis Hominis became a powerful world figure during the few days of his escape.

Again hospitalized, he sees in the news increasing social, religious, and political unrest in the world, and again feels the need to escape the institution to put order in the streets. He wanders through society, influencing and interfering in isolated incidents, correcting wrongs and exposing corruption primarily in a strictly accidental or coincidental manner.

There is also a parallel sub-plot regarding the impending closure of the asylum due to the cessation of funding from an anonymous benefactor.

Cast
José Mojica Marins
Andréa Bryan
Rosalvo Caçador
Maria Cristina
Nivaldo de Lima
Sabrina Marquezine
Palito
Amires Paranhos
Walter C. Portella
Araken Saldanha (as the voice of José Mojica Marins)
Roney Wanderney

References

External links 
Official film site 

1972 comedy films
1972 films
Brazilian comedy films
Films directed by José Mojica Marins
1970s Portuguese-language films